The Pichiaceae are a family of yeasts in the order Saccharomycetales. According to the 2007 Outline of Ascomycota, the family contains four genera, but GBIF lists 15 genera. The family was named by Zender in 1925.

Genera
As listed by GBIF;
 Allodekkera (2)
 Brettanomyces  (5)
 Byrrha 
 Dekkera  (23)
 Enteroramus  
 Hansenula  (7)
 Issatchenkia  (37)
 Komagataella  (21)
 Kregervanrija   (7)
 Martiniozyma  (5)
 Nakazawaea   (31)
 Phaffomyces  (6)
 Pichia   (155)
 Saturnispora   (40)
 Willia  

Figures in brackets are approx. how many species per genus.

References

Saccharomycetes